"Seasons" is the debut single of Canadian hard rock band The Veer Union off the album Against the Grain. It was used as the theme song for the 2009 WWE Backlash PPV.

Song meaning

"In life, many people come up against an obstacle and give up or are so tainted by the traumatic event that they give up. 'Seasons' is a metaphor for starting over no matter what the circumstance. We all go through rough times in life, but we are still here, and as long as we live, we must enjoy life and carry on and learn from everything we experience, that’s what makes us human," said vocalist Crispin Earl in a 2010 interview.

Charts

Usage in popular culture

The Pittsburgh Penguins used "Seasons" as an unofficial theme song on their road to the 2009 Stanley Cup title. The Penguins' general manager had heard the song on the radio and fell in love with it.

References

2009 singles
2009 songs
Universal Motown Records singles